Wu Yue (born 10 April 1972) is a Chinese actress, best known in film for portraying Li Weihua in Chrysanthemum Tea, Chen Cuifen in Road to Dawn and Li Lianqiao in Former Wife, and has received critical acclaim for her television work, particularly as Wen Lu in Age of Peace and Dong Guilan in The Great China Earthquake.

Biography

Early life and education
Wu Yue was born on April 10, 1972, in Minhang District of Shanghai city. Her father, Wu Yiren, is a calligrapher and painter. After high school, she entered Shanghai Theatre Academy, majoring in acting.

Acting career
Wu made her acting debut in An Autumn's Story of Beijing, playing Chen Xiaofeng.

In 1996, she appeared in the military television series Age of Peace, which earned her an Outstanding Supporting Actress award at the China TV Golden Eagle Award. That same year, she co-starred with Chen Baoguo and Hu Jun in the romance film Burning Desire.

In 2000, she starred as Li Weihua in Chrysanthemum Tea, for which she won Favorite Actress Award at the 8th Beijing College Student Film Festival.

She won the Most Promising Newcomer Award at the 2007 Shanghai International Film Festival for her performance in the historical romance film Road to Dawn (2007), and was nominated for Best Supporting Actress Award at the 9th Changchun Film Festival and Outstanding Actress Award at the 12th Huabiao Awards.

In 2009, she starred in comedy drama film Glittering Days.

In 2010, she appeared in Qiao Liang's drama film Former Wife, which earned her an Outstanding Actress Award at the 10th Baihe Awards, and was nominated for the Best Actress Award at the 1st Macau International Movie Festival.

In 2013, she appeared in The Great China Earthquake, a disaster television series. The same year, she starred in the historical romantic film The Lady in the Portrait, alongside Fan Bingbing and Melvil Poupaud.

In 2015, she starred in the war film Hundred Regiments Offensive, directed by Ning Haiqiang.

In 2017, Wu starred in the critically acclaimed modern drama The First Half of My Life, which earned her a nomination at the Magnolia Awards.

Filmography

Film

Television series

Awards

References

External links

1976 births
Living people
Shanghai Theatre Academy alumni
Actresses from Shanghai
Chinese film actresses
Chinese television actresses
21st-century Chinese actresses
20th-century Chinese actresses